Moelleria is a genus of sea snails, marine gastropod mollusks in the family Colloniidae.

Species
Species within the genus Moelleria include:
 Moelleria costulata (Møller, 1842)
Species brought into synonymy
 Moelleria drusiana Dall, 1919: synonym of Spiromoelleria quadrae (Dall, 1897)
 Moelleria laevigata Friele, 1876: synonym of Skenea trochoides (Friele, 1876)
 Moelleria quadrae Dall, 1997: synonym of  Spiromoelleria quadrae (Dall, 1897)

References

 Abbott R. T. (1974). American Seashells. The marine mollusca of the Atlantic and Pacific coast of North America. II edit. Van Nostrand, New York 663 p. + 24 pl: page(s): 61
 Vaught, K.C. (1989). A classification of the living Mollusca. American Malacologists: Melbourne, FL (USA). . XII, 195 pp.
 Gofas, S.; Le Renard, J.; Bouchet, P. (2001). Mollusca, in: Costello, M.J. et al. (Ed.) (2001). European register of marine species: a check-list of the marine species in Europe and a bibliography of guides to their identification. Collection Patrimoines Naturels, 50: pp. 180–213 (

External links

Colloniidae
Monotypic gastropod genera